Jeremy Kyle's Emergency Room is a British reality medical show presented by Jeremy Kyle that aired on ITV for two series between 15 June 2015 and 3 February 2017.

Background
The show is based on people's medical worries in which doctors attempt to resolve issues. These issues can often be sexual, physical or mental. Frequently, patients display strong emotions such as distress. Sometimes, patients don't let their partners in the emergency room. In the show, Jeremy Kyle harangues the patients from a childishly simplistic perspective, in spite of having no known medical training or background.

Transmissions

References

2015 British television series debuts
2017 British television series endings
2010s British reality television series
2010s British medical television series
English-language television shows
ITV reality television shows
Television series by ITV Studios